Wylie Ridge is a ridge that extends westward from Meier Peak in the Admiralty Mountains. It parallels the north side of Massey Glacier for 6 nautical miles (11 km) and terminates at Man-o-War Glacier. Mapped by United States Geological Survey (USGS) from surveys and U.S. Navy air photos, 1960–63. Named by Advisory Committee on Antarctic Names (US-ACAN) for Lieutenant Commander Ronald P. Wylie, U.S. Navy, pilot with Squadron VX-6 during Operation Deep Freeze 1967 and 1968.

Ridges of Victoria Land
Borchgrevink Coast